Robert Marian Moldoveanu (born 8 March 1999) is a Romanian professional footballer who plays  as a forward for Liga I club Petrolul Ploiești.

Club career
Robert Moldoveanu started his career at Dinamo București. He was raised by Dinamo and promoted to the first team by Flavius Stoican. In February 2017, Moldoveanu joined FC Brașov on loan. On 14 January 2019, Moldoveanu joined Petrolul Ploiești on loan.

On 13 January 2022, Farul Constanța announced the signing of Moldoveanu. On 26 December 2022, Moldoveanu was released from the club after having his contract mutually terminated.

On 4 January 2023, Petrolul Ploiești announced the re-signing of Moldoveanu on a one-and-a-half-year contract.

Career statistics

Club

References

External links
 
 

1999 births
Living people
Footballers from Bucharest
Romanian footballers
Association football forwards
Liga I players
Liga II players
FC Dinamo București players
FC Brașov (1936) players
FC Petrolul Ploiești players
FCV Farul Constanța players
Romania youth international footballers
Romania under-21 international footballers